Slettmarkhøe is a mountain in Lom Municipality in Innlandet county, Norway. The mountain is surrounded by several other notable mountains including Store Svartdalspiggen and Mesmogtinden to the east; Langedalstinden, Kvitskardtinden, and Torfinnstindene to the southeast; Slettmarkpiggen and Slettmarkkampen to the southwest; Snøholstinden and Store Rauddalseggi to the northwest; and Storådalshøi to the north.

See also
List of mountains of Norway by height

References

Jotunheimen
Lom, Norway
Mountains of Innlandet